Pungsan Sim clan was one of the Korean clans. Their Bon-gwan was in Andong, North Gyeongsang Province. According to the research in 2015, the number of Pungsan Sim clan was 11187. Their founder was  who was from Zhejiang. He visited Goryeo for business in 1110 and was settled in Pungsan. He excelled at literature. He was appointed as Minister of Rites because he won the Yejong of Goryeo’s favor. His descendant began Pungsan Sim clan and made Pungsan their Bon-gwan.

See also 
 Korean clan names of foreign origin

References

External links 
 

 
Korean clan names of Chinese origin